Amir Brigadier General Hassan Shahsafi was the commander of the Iranian Air Force from August 2008 to August 2018. He used to fly Northrop F-5 and was based in Dezful Air Base before he was appointed as the IRIAF Commander.

References 

Living people
Islamic Republic of Iran Army brigadier generals
Commanders of Islamic Republic of Iran Air Force
Islamic Republic of Iran Army personnel of the Iran–Iraq War
Year of birth missing (living people)